This is a list of mayors of Milpitas, California.

List of mayors

References

Mayors
Milpitas
Milpitas mayors